Charli is a Spanish masculine given name and nickname that is a diminutive form of Carlos as well as an English unisex given name and nickname that is a feminine form of Charlie and a diminutive form of Charles and Charline. Notable people referred to by this name include the following:

Given name
Charli Collier (born 1999), American basketball player
Charli D'Amelio (born 2004), American social media influencer and dancer
Charli Knott (born 2002), Australian cricketer 
Charli Turner Thorne (born 1966), American basketball coach

Nickname or stagename
Charli Baltimore, stage name of Tiffany Lane Jarmon (born 1974), American female rapper and songwriter
Charli Howard, nickname of Charlotte Howard (born 1991), English female model, author, and body activist
Charli Persip, professional name of Charles Lawrence Persip who was formerly known as Charlie Persip (born 1929), American male jazz drummer
Charli Robinson, professional name of Sharlene Marie Zeta Robinson, (born 1981) Australian female television and radio presenter as well as an original member of Hi-5
Charli Taft, stage name of Charlotte Taft, British female singer and songwriter 
Charli XCX, stage name of Charlotte Emma Aitchison (born 1992), English female singer and songwriter

See also

Charl (name)
Charlin (name)
Charlis Ortiz
Charls

Notes

English feminine given names
English masculine given names
Spanish masculine given names